Somatel-Liebherr Spa: is a joint venture between  the German Liebherr Group and Somatel subsidiary of The ENMTP  Within the industrial recovery initiated by the government for the modernization and development of the industrial sector of public works equipment, a new partnership was formalized between two companies as joint venture (J.V), founded in 2012 and located in the industrial area of Ain Smara Constantine, started the production on 2013  under the label Somatel-Liebherr.

Shareholders
The company is composed of two main shareholders, namely Somatel with (51%) The second shareholder is Liebherr Group with (49%),

Products 

The current line of products manufactured by the company includes:

Hydraulic Excavators

 A 904
 R 926 C
 R 954 C

Wheel loaders

 L 524
 L 566

Bulldozers

 PR 744
 PR 754

References

External links
-http://www.liebherr.com/en/deu/about-liebherr/liebherr-worldwide/algeria/liebherr-in-algeria.html
-http://www.enmtp.com/somatel-liebherr-2/

Economy of Constantine, Algeria
Companies established in 2012
Companies based in Constantine, Algeria
Government-owned companies of Algeria
Algerian brands
ENMTP

Companies of Algeria
2011 establishments in Algeria